Battlefield 2: Modern Combat is a first-person shooter video game in the Battlefield series, developed by DICE and published by Electronic Arts. Modern Combat is the first Battlefield game for video game consoles and also was a standalone side-story/expansion for Battlefield 2 which was released exclusively on Windows that same year.

The game was initially released for PlayStation 2 and Xbox in 2005. In 2006, an updated version of the game was released for the Xbox 360 featuring improved graphics and online features. A PlayStation Portable version was developed by EA Bright Light and announced in 2005, but was canceled. Battlefield 2: Modern Combat multiplayer on Xbox was shut down on April 15, 2010. As of June 30, 2014, all Xbox, Xbox 360, and PlayStation 2 servers are offline.

Plot
The single player campaign game revolves around a fictional war between NATO and China that takes place in Kazakhstan. The media on both sides air propaganda that accuses the other of war crimes while the player fights for each nation back and forth. When the player eventually chooses a side to lead to victory, it is revealed that a terrorist organization called Burning Flag is responsible for misleading both NATO and China into starting the war. Various war crimes each side believes the other committed during the fighting were in fact arranged by Burning Flag, which also sabotaged the only known attempt at negotiations. The winning side must then stop Burning Flag's leader, Commander 31, from launching 3 nuclear ICBMs at the United States, Europe, and China; failure would mean neither side would have anything left to fight for or live for. During the course of an intense battle, the ICBM launches are halted and Commander 31 killed, with the player being hailed as the hero who made China's- or NATO's- victory possible.

Multiplayer gameplay
Multiplayer differs heavily from Campaign mode. The game offers two game modes, Conquest, and Capture the Flag. Both game modes support a total of 24 players.

Like the game itself says, it changes online, and it is shown throughout gameplay. Various features such as sounds, movement, weaponry, and even different buttons are used different ways in multiplayer to better fit the competitors. Players can choose to play on whichever two sides are on a map, which can be NATO (American or European) against China, or NATO (American) against MEC. EU and China never clash against MEC on any map in multiplayer. There is a large selection of maps on which large multiplayer battles will ensue. They range from desert towns to a secret Chinese airfield. Note however that during Capture The Flag matches the maps are downsized. Only the middle fraction of the map is playable.

Conquest
In Conquest, the goal is to capture a majority of the flags scattered across the map. There are two counters, which show the tickets remaining on either side. The tickets decrease by 1 for each time a player spawns after death or the initial spawn on the corresponding side, and by progressively more, depending on the number of flags either team has. The more flags one team has, the faster the other's tickets will decrease. If there is only one member alive and all flags have been taken by the other team, the tickets will decrease rapidly until the person is killed or has taken a flag. If both sides have an equal number of flags, neither team's tickets will decrease, unless a member of one team dies, in which case one ticket is subtracted from the victim's team. Vehicles are readily available in this mode, and there are multiple types of maps, such as "Incursion" maps, in which every flag owned by only one of the teams is capture-able.

Capture the flag
In Capture the flag, players battle on a scaled down version of any one of the maps. There are only two positions, one on each side, which house each team's flag. There are multiple spawns in each position. Instead of the flags being mounted on flagpoles, as in Conquest mode, they are instead small flags perched on small bases. When a player walks over a flag, it is automatically picked up. The player carrying it must return it to their own base. The flag may only be captured if the capturing team's flag is still at their base, and not taken by their opponent. If the player carrying the flag is killed, one of his teammates may pick up the flag he dropped when he died and continue taking it to their base or an enemy may run over it, at which point the flag is automatically returned safely to their base.

Online play also supports the clan option. A single person can create a clan and invite other players into the clan, they are also able to promote, demote, and kick members as well. Customizable options include the clan name, clan motto, and clan news. Both gamemodes are accepted on the clan feature. In starting a clan match is when a challenge gets accepted or, the leader needs someone to "back" him, this means as soon as the challenge is accepted a teammate must check for a clan game and quickly join it in order for the clan match to take place.

Downloadable content
A pack of three additional maps were made available for purchase sometime in late 2005 for Xbox Live and PS2 Online users. These same three maps were included on disc for the reissued Xbox 360 version.

Reception

Battlefield 2: Modern Combat received "generally favorable reviews" on all platforms according to the review aggregation website Metacritic. In Japan, where the PlayStation 2 version was ported for release on January 26, 2006, followed by the Xbox 360 version on March 30, 2006, Famitsu gave the former console version a score of three eights and one seven for a total of 31 out of 40, while Famitsu X360 gave the latter console version a score of one nine, two eights, and one seven for a total of 32 out of 40.

References

External links
 

2005 video games
Products and services discontinued in 2010
 03.4
Cancelled PlayStation Portable games
PlayStation 2 games
Electronic Arts games
Inactive multiplayer online games
Multiplayer and single-player video games
Multiplayer online games
Fiction about the People's Liberation Army
RenderWare games
Video games about the United States Marine Corps
Video games developed in Sweden
Video games scored by Rupert Gregson-Williams
Video games set in Afghanistan
Video games set in China
Video games set in Iraq
Video games set in Kazakhstan
Video games set in Kuwait
Video games set in Russia
Video games set in Syria
War video games set in the United States
Xbox games
Xbox 360 games
Works about Chinese military personnel

de:Battlefield 2#Battlefield 2: Modern Combat